Geoff Burdett (born 4 July 1956) is a former Australian rules footballer who played with Essendon in the Victorian Football League (VFL). He later returned to his home club of Hopetoun and also spent time playing with Warracknabeal and Birchip, all three of which he was captain-coach.

Notes

External links 
		

Essendon Football Club past player profile

Living people
1956 births
Australian rules footballers from Victoria (Australia)
Essendon Football Club players
Warracknabeal Football Club players